Under the Queen's Umbrella is a 2022 South Korean television series starring Kim Hye-soo, Kim Hae-sook, and Choi Won-young. It aired from October 15 to December 4, 2022, on tvN's Saturdays and Sundays at 21:10 (KST) time slot. It is also available for streaming on Netflix in selected regions.

Synopsis
Set in a fictional period within the Joseon dynasty, the series deals with the top 1% education method to make the troublemaker princes, who cause nuisance for the royal family, into proper princes.

Cast

Main
 Kim Hye-soo as Queen Im Hwa-ryeong
 Chaerin as young Im Hwa-ryeong
 Kim Hae-sook as Queen Dowager
 Choi Won-young as King Yi Ho
 Choi Yoon-je as young Yi Ho

Supporting

Queen's sons
 Moon Sang-min as Grand Prince Seongnam / Yi Kang (personal name)
 Bae In-hyuk as Crown Prince
 Yoon Sang-hyeon as Grand Prince Muan
 Yoo Seon-ho as Grand Prince Gyeseong / Yi Hwan (personal name)
 Park Ha-jun as Grand Prince Ilyeong

Concubines
 Ok Ja-yeon as Royal Consort Gwi-in Hwang, later demoted to Royal Consort Sug-won
 Kim Ga-eun as Royal Consort So-yong Tae
 Woo Jung-won as Royal Consort Gwi-in Go

Concubines' sons
 Kang Chan-hee as Prince Uiseong
 Kim Min-gi as Prince Bogum
 Moon Seong-hyun as Prince Simso

People in the palace
 Kim Eui-sung as Chief State Councillor Hwang Won-hyeong
 Jang Hyun-sung as Minister of Military Affairs Yoon Soo-kwang

Others
 Oh Ye-ju as Yoon Cheong-ha
 Jeon Hye-won as Cho-wol
 Seo Yi-sook as Deposed Queen Yoon

Extended
 Shin Soo-jeong as Royal Consort So-ui Kim
 Song Young-ah as Royal Consort Sug-ui Choi
 Lee Ha-young as Royal Consort So-won Moon
 Lee Hwa-kyum as Royal Consort Sug-won Ok
 Lee So-hee as Special Court Lady Park
 Shin Ian as Prince Yeongmin
 Hong Jae-min as Prince Hodong
 Kim Young-jae as Chief Royal Secretary Min Seung-yun
 Lee Jung-eun as Court Lady Nam
 Yoo Yeon as Court Lady Oh
 Park Jun-myeon as Court Lady Shin
 Kim Jae-bum as Physician Kwon / Yi Ik-hyeon (real name)
 Cha Sung-je as young Yi Ik-hyeon
 Kwon Hae-hyo as Master Toji / Yoo Sang-uk (real name)
 Kim Seung-soo as Park Gyeong-woo
 Han Dong-hee as Crown Princess Min
 Seo Woo-jin as Grand Heir
 Tae Won-seok as Seo Ham-deok
 Yoon Seul as Mak-ryeo
 Jo Ah-young as Min Seung-yun's eldest daughter
 Kim Jung-ho as Royal Physician Cho Guk-yeong
 Ha Dong-joon as Personnel Officer Lee Jo-jeon-rang

Special appearances
 Jung Ji-hoon as a passerby
 Ahn Yong-joon as the representative of Sungkyunkwan scholars
 Park Hyo-joo as a nursemaid
 Jung Soon-won

Production
Most of the scenes were filmed at Mungyeong Saejae Open Set, some were filmed in Jeonju Hanok Village. Lead actress Kim Hye-soo filmed her parts from April 2 to November 20, 2022.

On November 21, 2022, it was revealed that actor Moon Sang-min suffered facial injury in the lower part of his left eye while filming an action scene at the end of October. He underwent surgery and returned to the set after a few days.

Viewership

Notes

References

External links
  
 
 
 

Korean-language television shows
TVN (South Korean TV channel) television dramas
Television series by Studio Dragon
South Korean historical television series
Television series set in the Joseon dynasty
2022 South Korean television series debuts
2022 South Korean television series endings